Daniel Burgner (born December 10, 1954) is a bobsledder who represented the United States Virgin Islands. He competed in the two man and four man events at the 1992 Winter Olympics.

References

External links
 

1954 births
Living people
United States Virgin Islands male bobsledders
Olympic bobsledders of the United States Virgin Islands
Bobsledders at the 1992 Winter Olympics
Place of birth missing (living people)